Monte Aprazível is a municipality in the state of São Paulo, Brazil. The population is of 25,373 inhabitants, and the area is 496.9 km2.

Known as "The Dream's Dam City", because of a dam located nearby the city center.

Monte Aprazível belongs to the Mesoregion of São José do Rio Preto and is located 475 km from the city of São Paulo.

History

Monte Aprazível was founded by Captain Porfírio de Alcântara Pimentel, who was born in the city of Areias, São Paulo. On December 18, 1914, the district is created, and on December 23, 1924, the municipality is established with the emancipation from Rio Preto.

1936 shooting

On December 18, 1936, a Brazilian farmer supposedly killed 16 people in Monte Aprazível, Brazil. A Japanese colonist named Fiorky had caught the man's 10-year-old son in his orchard stealing fruit and cut off his hand with an axe. The boy returned home, told his father about the incident, and died shortly thereafter, whereupon the farmer took a shotgun and hid by the roadside, shooting every Japanese passing by. He was arrested by police after shooting dead 16 of them, including the sons of the man who had killed his son.

According to some reports the farmer shot dead every Japanese passing by, because he had difficulties of recognizing Fiorky, the Japanese colonist who killed his son. Another report states that the farmer first killed the Japanese colonist, then murdered every member of the family of Fiorky, among them four children and three women.

The story, which was widely published by newspapers, was later found to be baseless. The newspaper O Jornal contacted the regional police station of Rio Preto, inquiring about the incident, and the respective authorities declared that the incident lacked veracity and nothing abnormal had happened in Monte Aprazível, or Novo Oriente.

Economy

The Tertiary sector and the Industry are the economic basis of Monte Aprazível. Commerce, services and public administration corresponds to 49% of the city GDP. The Secondary sector is 45.5% of the GDP, and the Primary sector corresponds to 5.5%.

Transportation

SP-310 Rodovia Feliciano Sales Cunha
SP-377 Rodovia Deputado Bady Bassitt

References

Municipalities in São Paulo (state)